The Ontario order of precedence is a nominal and symbolic hierarchy used for ceremonial occasions of a provincial nature of within the province of Ontario. It has no legal standing but is used to dictate ceremonial protocol.

Ontario order of precedence
This is a list of the order of precedence in Ontario 
The King of Canada (His Majesty Charles III)
Lieutenant Governor of Ontario (Elizabeth Dowdeswell )
Premier of Ontario (Doug Ford )
Chief Justice of Ontario (George Strathy )
Former Lieutenant Governors of Ontario, in order of their departure from office:
Hal Jackman  (1991–1997)
Hilary Weston  (1997–2002)
James Bartleman  (2002–2007)
Former Premiers of Ontario, in order of their first assumption of office:
David Peterson  (1985–1990)
Bob Rae  (1990–1995)
Mike Harris  (1995–2002)
Ernie Eves  (2002–2003)
Dalton McGuinty  (2003–2013)
Kathleen Wynne (2013–2018)
Speaker of the Legislative Assembly of Ontario (Ted Arnott )
Heads of accredited diplomatic missions in Ottawa, in order of the date they presented their diplomatic credentials to the Governor General of Canada:
 Sofia Lastenia Cerrato Rodriguez (September 2010)
 Mahamat Ali Adoum (June 2014)
 Pg Kamal Bashah Pg Ahmad (October 2014)
 Elisenda Vives Balmana (April 2016)
 Ermal Muca (June 2016)
 Martin Alejandro Vidal Delgado (September 2016)
 Jamal Abdullah Yahya Al-Sallal (November 2016)
 Mohamed Siad Douale (March 2017)
 Sabine Anne Sparwasser (August 2017)
 Joy Ruth Acheng (September 2017)
 Adeyinka Olatokunbo Asekun (October 2017)
 Mohamed Imed Torjemane (October 2017)
 Felix Mfula (October 2017)
 Maurizio Carlo Gelli (November 2017)
 Fahad Saeed M. A. Alraqbani (January 2018)
 Fadi Ziadeh (January 2018)
 Vaughna Sherry Tross (February 2018)
 Viviane Laure Elisabeth Bampassy (March 2018)
 Souriya Otmani (June 2018)
 Akylbek Kamaldinov (June 2018)
 Vasilios Philippou (June 2018)
 Roberto Rafael Max Rodriguez Arnillas (June 2018)
 Svetlana Sashova Stoycheva-Etropolski (June 2018)
 Toomas Lukk (September 2018)
 Vit Koziak (September 2018)
 Ariunbold Yadmaa (November 2018)
 Ahmed Mahmoud A. Abu Zeid (November 2018)
 Kerim Uras (December 2018)
 Salome Meyer (February 2019)
 Urban Christian Ahlin (February 2019)
 Juan Jose Ignacio Gomez Camacho (May 2019)
 Bhrigu Dhungana (May 2019)
 Anahit Harutyunyan (July 2019)
 Roy Kennet Eriksson (July 2019)
 Wadee Batti Hanna Albatti (July 2019)
 Mpoki Mwasumbi Ulisubisya (September 2019)
 Borek Lizec (September 2019)
 Marko Milisav (September 2019)
 Mauricio Ortiz Ortiz (September 2019)
 Hanne Fugl Eskjaer (September 2019)
 Peiwu Cong (November 2019)
 M. Hassan Soroosh (November 2019)
 Majed Alqatarneh (November 2019)
 Prosper Higiro (November 2019)
 Reem M Kh Z Alkhaled (November 2019)
 Orlando José Viera Blanco (November 2019)
 Ruth Masodzi Chikwira (December 2019)
 Vice Skracic (December 2019)
 Romy Vasquez Morales (December 2019)
 Darius Skusevicius (December 2019)
 Martin Wilfred Harvey (January 2020)
 Adriatik Kryeziu (March 2020)
 Pedro Henrique Lopes Borio (March 2020)
 Fatima Meite (March 2020)
 Ajay Bisaria (March 2020)
 Cao Phong Pham (July 2020)
 Keung Ryong Chang (July 2020)
 Sharon Joyce Miller (August 2020)
 Kallayana Vipattipumiprates (October 2020)
 Goverdina Christina Coppoolse (October 2020)
 Maria Eva Vass-Salazar (October 2020)
 Jon Elvedal Fredriksen (October 2020)
 Eamonn Mckee (October 2020)
 Dejan Ralevic (November 2020)
 Wien-Weibert Arthus (November 2020)
 Hassan Dahir Dimbil (November 2020)
 Rodolfo Robles (November 2020)
 Konstantina Athanassiadou (November 2020)
 Ricardo Alfonso Cisneros Rodriguez (November 2020)
 Melita Gabric (February 2021)
 Bogdan Manoiu (March 2021)
 Dr Khalilur Rahman (March 2021)
 Guisela Atalida Godinez Sazo (March 2021)
 Michelle Cohen De Friedlander (March 2021)
 Emil Druc (March 2021)
 Sylvia Meier-Kajbic (March 2021)
 Dennis Daniel Moses (March 2021)
 Jorge Alberto Julian Londono De La Cuesta (March 2021)
 Maria Josefina Martinez Gramuglia (March 2021)
 Raul Eduardo Fernandez Daza (March 2021)
 Susannah Clare Goshko (August 2021)
 Oleg Stepanov (September 2021)
 Bafetigue Ouattara (September 2021)
 Andrea Ferrari (September 2021)
 Hlynur Gudjonsson (September 2021)
 Immaculate Nduku Musili Wambua (November 2021)
 Patrick Guido M. Van Gheel (November 2021)
 Molise Paul Tseole (November 2021)
 Anizan Binti Adnin (December 2021)
 Ivan Jurkovic (December 2021)
 Andrej Gregor Rode (December 2021)
 Anselm Ransford Adzete Sowah (December 2021)
 Harsha Kumara Navaratne Weraduwa (December 2021)
 Alfredo Martinez Serrano (December 2021)
 Ronen Pinchas Hoffman (December 2021)
 David Louis Cohen (December 2021)
 Scott Michael Ryan (December 2021)
 Khalid Rashid S. H. Al-Mansouri (March 2022)
 Gline Arley Clarke (April 2022)
 Noureddine Bardad Daidj (April 2022)
 Daniel Tumpal Sumurung Simanjuntak (April 2022)
 Rieaz Shaik (April 2022)
 Kaspars Ozolins (April 2022)
Members of the Executive Council of Ontario, in accordance with the precedence document issued by the Cabinet Office:
Raymond Cho, Minister for Seniors and Accessibility
Steve Clark, Minister of Municipal Affairs and Housing
Vic Fedeli, Chair of Cabinet, Minister of Economic Development, Job Creation and Trade
Caroline Mulroney, Minister of Francophone Affairs, Minister of Transportation
Paul Calandra, Minister of Long-Term Care, Minister of Legislative Affairs
Doug Downey, Attorney General
Stephen Lecce, Minister of Education
Monte McNaughton, Minister of Labour, Immigration, Training and Skills Development
Michael Tibollo, Associate Minister of Mental Health and Addictions
Peter Bethlenfalvy, Minister of Finance
Stan Cho, Associate Minister of Transportation
Jill Dunlop, Minister of Colleges and Universities
Merrilee Fullerton, Minister of Children, Community and Social Services
David Piccini, Minister of the Environment, Conservation and Parks
Greg Rickford, Minister of Northern Development, Minister of Indigenous Affairs
Prabmeet Sarkaria, President of the Treasury Board
Todd Smith, Minister of Energy
Kinga Surma, Minister of Infrastructure
Lisa Thompson, Minister of Agriculture, Food and Rural Affairs
Michael Ford, Minister of Citizenship and Multiculturalism
Parm Gill, Minister of Red Tape Reduction
Sylvia Jones, Minister of Health, Deputy Premier
Michael Kerzner, Solicitor General
Neil Lumsden, Minister of Tourism, Culture and Sport
Michael Parsa, Associate Minister of Housing
George Pirie, Minister of Mines
Kaleed Rasheed, Minister of Public and Business Service Delivery
Graydon Smith, Minister of Natural Resources and Forestry
Charmaine Williams, Associate Minister of Women's Social and Economic Opportunity
Leader of His Majesty's Loyal Opposition (Peter Tabuns )
Members of the King's Privy Council for Canada residing in Ontario:
Members of the Cabinet of Canada, in order of their appointment:
Chrystia Freeland , Deputy Prime Minister of Canada (2019), Minister of Finance (2020)
Carolyn Bennett , Minister of Mental Health and Addictions (2021), Associate Minister of Health (2021)
Patty Hajdu , Minister of Indigenous Services (2021), Minister responsible for the Federal Economic Development Agency for Northern Ontario (2021)
Karina Gould , Minister of Families, Children, and Social Development (2021)
Ahmed Hussen , Minister of Housing, Diversity and Inclusion (2021)
Bill Blair , Minister of Emergency Preparedness (2021), President of the King's Privy Council for Canada (2021)
Mary Ng , Minister of International Trade, Export Promotion, Small Business and Economic Development (2021)
Filomena Tassi , Minister of Public Services and Procurement (2021)
Mark Holland , Leader of the Government in the House of Commons (2021)
Anita Anand , Minister of National Defence (2021)
Mona Fortier , President of the Treasury Board (2021)
Marco Mendicino , Minister of Public Safety (2021)
Omar Alghabra , Minister of Transport (2021)
Marci Ien , Minister for Women and Gender Equality and Youth (2021)
Helena Jaczek , Minister responsible for the Federal Economic Development Agency for Southern Ontario (2021)
Kamal Khera , Minister of Seniors (2021)
Other members of the Privy Council, in order of their appointment:
Jean-Jacques Blais  (1976)
Tony Abbott  (1976)
David MacDonald  (1979)
David Crombie  (1979)
Perrin Beatty  (1979)
James Fleming  (1980)
Ed Lumley  (1980)
Paul Cosgrove  (1980)
Judy Erola  (1980)
Ed Broadbent  (1982)
David Collenette  (1983)
Roy MacLaren  (1983)
Otto Jelinek  (1984)
Rob Nicholson  (1993)
Bev Oda  (2006)
Marjory LeBreton  (2006)
Diane Finley  (2006)
Michael Chong  (2006)
Gordon O'Connor  (2006)
John Baird  (2006)
Tony Clement  (2006)
Peter Van Loan  (2006)
Gary Goodyear  (2008)
Lisa Raitt  (2008)
Julian Fantino  (2011)
Bal Gosal  (2011)
Joe Oliver  (2011)
Peter Kent  (2011)
Kellie Leitch  (2013)
Pierre Poilievre  (2013)
Ed Holder  (2014)
Erin O'Toole  (2015)
Jane Philpott  (2015)
Chief Justice of the Ontario Superior Court of Justice (Geoffrey B. Morawetz)
Associate Chief Justice of Ontario (J. Michal Fairburn)
Associate Chief Justice of the Ontario Superior Court of Justice (Faye McWatt)
Judges of the Court of Appeal for Ontario, in order of date of appointment
Judges of the Ontario Superior Court of Justice, in order of date of appointment
Members of the Legislative Assembly of Ontario, in order of the date of their first election to the Legislature
Members of the Senate who represent Ontario, in order by their date of appointment
Members of the House of Commons who represent Ontario constituencies, in order by their date of election
Heads of religious denominations
Heads of Consular Post with jurisdiction in the Province of Ontario with precedence governed by date of exequatur
Judges of the Ontario Court of Justice
Chair of the host Regional Municipality (where applicable)host Mayor
Other Chairs of Regional Municipalities (where applicable)Other Mayors, in order by their date of appointment or election to officeAboriginal leaders: Chiefs of the Treaty First Nations in Ontario
Deputy Ministers, with precedence governed by date of appointmentOther Ontario Public Service Officials with the rank and status of Deputy Ministers, with precedence governed by date of appointment

References

External links
 Table of Precedence for Ontario

Ontario
Government of Ontario